Alalomantis is a genus of praying mantis in the family Mantidae.

See also
List of mantis genera and species

References

Mantidae
Mantodea genera